Finey is an unincorporated community in southeastern Henry County, in the U.S. state of Missouri. The community is on Missouri Route Z just over one mile from the Henry-Benton county line. The Osage arm of the Truman Reservoir and the Henry-St Clair county line is approximately one mile to the south. The Grand River arm of the reservoir is about two miles to the north of the community.

History
A post office called Finey was established in 1884, and remained in operation until 1911. An early settler named the community after his nephew, Finey West.

References

Unincorporated communities in Henry County, Missouri
Unincorporated communities in Missouri